Catriona MacColl (born 3 October 1954) is an English actress who has worked extensively in both film and television across Europe. She is best known for her work in Italian horror films, as she has appeared in Lucio Fulci's City of the Living Dead (1980), The Beyond (1981) and The House by the Cemetery (1981).

Early life
MacColl was born in London on 3 October 1954. In her youth, she trained professionally as a ballerina from the age of five, attending the Royal Ballet School. As a young adult, MacColl suffered a foot injury that prevented her from continuing her career path in dancing.

Career
MacColl is recognised for her work on European television and film, mainly in Italy. She has gained somewhat of a cult status, by horror fans, because of her career as an Italian horror actress. 

MacColl began her career in the late 1970s, making her debut in the French romantic drama Le dernier amant romantique, in which she received a small role. In 1979, she received her first leading role in Lady Oscar, a historical drama directed by Jacques Demy based on the manga Rose of Versailles by Riyoko Ikeda. According to MacColl, because Lady Oscar was not widely released in Europe, her career stalled: "I met all kinds of incredible French directors and of course they all knew Jacques. And they would all say: 'Oh, you’re the girl who played the lead in the Demy film that never came out?' So, they all knew who I was, but that really didn’t help me."Following her part in the drama Le fils puni, she appeared in the first of director Lucio Fulci's 'The Gates of Hell Trilogy', City of the Living Dead, playing the role of Mary Woodhouse, with Christopher George. MacColl was hesitant to do City of the Living Dead, because the script was badly written. "It seemed to me like a series of special effects without a story", she said in an interview in 2011. She called her agent to seek his advice. He told her to "take the film, because nobody is going to see it anyway." MacColl says her agent turned out to be wrong about that.

In her second role in the trilogy, The Beyond, she plays the role of Liza Merril, a young woman who inherits an infamous hotel in Louisiana only to discover what lies beneath it is one of the seven doors to Hell. MacColl has stated that The Beyond is her most favourable of the trilogy, for the fact that she enjoyed working with the cast and crew, especially David Warbeck, and that it was filmed in New Orleans. The final of the trilogy was The House by the Cemetery, for which she played Lucy Boyle, the mother and wife of a family who move into an old house, unaware that someone or something lives in the basement. MacColl did not originally plan to work in films with such a violent nature, as she had thought that they would not attract an audience, but following the growing fanbase of the trilogy over the years and that the films have received worldwide recognition, she is proud of the success of the trilogy.

MacColl was asked by Fulci to appear in The New York Ripper, but she declined.

She has also appeared in such films as Hawk the Slayer (1980), Afraid of the Dark (1991), A Good Year (2006), and most recently, the 2011 anthology film The Theatre Bizarre. She also starred in the Swiss short comedy film Employé du mois.

MacColl has had a successful career in television. In 1978 she made her television debut in the French series Il était un musicien. Her credits include the mystery series Sherlock Holmes and Doctor Watson, the short-lived BBC series Squadron, the mini-series The Last Days of Pompeii, Dempsey and Makepeace, The Hardy Boys, and the French soap opera Plus belle la vie.

Personal life
MacColl was married to actor Jon Finch from 1982 to 1987 and now lives in France.

Filmography

Film

Television
Squadron (1982; TV series) – Flt. Ct. Dr. Susan Young
Histoire d'un bonheur (1982) – Patricia
The Last Days of Pompeii (1984 TV mini-series) – Julia
Dempsey and Makepeace (TV series)
Hors de Combat (1985) – Angie Hughes
Katts and Dog (TV series)
The Grand Hotel Caper (1989) – Lydia
The Hitchhiker (TV series)
Garter Belt (1989) – Catherine
Counterstrike (TV series)
The Lady of the Rhine (1990) – Lorraine Sydberg
Strangers (TV series)
Touch (1996) – Eva
Plus belle la vie (2004–06; TV series)
Episode #2.182 (2006) – Ann Boccara

References

External links

Official site, cultcollectibles.com

1954 births
English film actresses
English television actresses
Living people
Actresses from London
20th-century English actresses
21st-century English actresses
English expatriates in France
Expatriate actresses in France